Vinson Horace Champ (born September 12, 1961) is a former American comedian and a convicted rapist. He was the winner of Star Search in 1992. In 1997, he was identified as a serial rapist when his DNA and tour schedule were matched up with a series of rapes on college campuses. He is currently serving a 30 to 40-year sentence at Nebraska State Penitentiary. His projected release date is in 2033, after which he will begin two consecutive life term sentences in Iowa.

Biography 
Champ was born on September 12, 1961. He won $100,000 as a comedian on Star Search in 1992. After that, Champ mostly performed on the college circuit. He was known as a nice, respectful comedian who only did 'clean' material, which made him a favorite for college bookers.

According to court documents, Champ's criminal record includes physically attacking his 17-year-old former girlfriend in 1996.

On May 6, 1997, Champ was spotted fleeing the scene of an attempted rape at Pasadena City College in Pasadena, California. He was arrested on May 7, 1997, at his apartment in Hollywood, California. The court released him on bail and he left for a trip to the Caribbean. When he returned on May 13, 1997, he was arrested at Newark International Airport in Newark, New Jersey after detectives in Omaha, Nebraska connected him to a similar rape at the University of Nebraska. At the time of his arrest, one of Champ's booking agents commented that Champ's schedule resembled "a road map of where these rapes occurred".

Champ followed a consistent pattern in his assaults. He sought out his victims inside college buildings. Each time, he covered the women's heads so they could not identify him, he talked to them during the assault, and he asked each of the women to pray for him afterward.

Rapes and attempted rapes linked to Champ 
 On September 6, 1996, he raped a woman at the University of Iowa in Iowa City. He was sentenced to life in prison without parole on November 15, 2002.
 On February 6, 1997, Champ raped a woman at Union College in Lincoln, Nebraska. He was sentenced to up to 40 years in prison in June 2000.
 On February 9, 1997, Champ was suspected of having attempted to rape a woman at Knox College in Galesburg, Illinois. No charges were brought against him.
 On February 10, 1997, authorities believe Champ raped a woman who was practicing piano at Carthage College in Kenosha, Wisconsin. No charges were brought against him.
 On February 16, 1997, Champ raped a woman at St. Ambrose College in Davenport, Iowa. Only 5 hours earlier that day, an attempted assault took place at Augustana College in neighboring Rock Island, Illinois. Authorities suspected Champ, but no charges were brought against him.
 On March 5, 1997, Champ raped a woman working alone in a computer lab at the University of Nebraska, Omaha, for which he received a 25 to 30-years prison sentence on July 3, 2000. He appealed his conviction to the Nebraska Court of Appeals in 2001; the conviction was upheld.
 On May 6, 1997, Champ attempted to rape a woman at Pasadena City College in Pasadena, California. He fled when the woman screamed, but two witnesses heard the woman's screams noted the license plate number of the car he fled with. Champ was arrested on May 7, 1997.

See also 
 List of serial rapists

References 

Living people
African-American male comedians
American male comedians
1961 births
American people convicted of rape
American rapists
Place of birth missing (living people)
People from Hollywood, Los Angeles
American male criminals
Comedians from California
21st-century American comedians
21st-century African-American people
20th-century African-American people